In the theory of dynamical systems, amplitude death is complete cessation of oscillations. The system can be in a state of either periodic motion or chaotic motion before it goes to amplitude death. A dynamical system can go to amplitude death because of change in intrinsic parameters of the system or its interaction with other systems or its environment.
Amplitude death can appear also because of the delay in the coupling between the systems

See also
Indeterminism
Nonlinear system
Chaos (disambiguation)

References

Dynamical systems